Lucas Rodrigues Moura da Silva (born 13 August 1992), known as Lucas Moura, is a Brazilian professional footballer who plays as a winger and forward for Premier League club Tottenham Hotspur.

Moura started his professional career at São Paulo where he became one of the best players in the Campeonato Paulista. His pace and dribbling skills garnered attention from numerous European clubs, eventually earning him a transfer to French side Paris Saint-Germain. After winning multiple domestic trophies over a five-year span at the club, Moura was then signed by English side Tottenham Hotspur. He was involved in the side reaching their first ever UEFA Champions League final, scoring a historic hat-trick against Ajax in the second leg of the semi-final of the competition to help Spurs advance to the final.

Moura made his senior international debut for Brazil in 2011 and has since earned over 30 caps, representing the nation at two editions of the Copa América, the 2012 Olympics (where he won a silver medal), and the 2013 FIFA Confederations Cup, winning the latter title.

Club career

São Paulo
Moura joined São Paulo FC in 2005 after playing for the youth teams of Clube Atlético Juventus and Corinthians and was known as Marcelinho since he played for a Marcelinho Carioca football school as a child and also had physical resemblance with the former footballer. Having had prominence at youth level, he was promoted to play professionally by Milton Cruz. Moura made his debut with the São Paulo first-team in 2010, scoring 4 goals and providing four assists in 25 appearances. In the same year, he stated his desire to be known for his given name instead of a nickname to "make his own history in football without comparisons". In 2011, Moura scored nine goals and provided four assists in 28 appearances in the Campeonato Brasileiro and 13 goals and eight assists in all competitions.

Paris Saint-Germain

During the summer of 2012, Manchester United and Inter Milan were reported to be interested in signing Moura. On 8 August 2012, Paris Saint-Germain won the battle and announced the player would be moving to the club in January 2013. He would be the club's most expensive signing. The transfer fee was reported to be in the region of €45 million (£38 million). It was announced that Moura would wear the No. 29 shirt for the remainder of the season.

On 11 January 2013, Moura made his debut against AC Ajaccio, in a match that ended as a 0–0 draw. He also played in the Champions League away victory over Valencia on 12 February, assisting a goal in the process. On 13 September 2013, he scored his first goal for PSG in a 2–0 league victory over Bordeaux.

For the 2014–15 season, following Jérémy Ménez's transfer to A.C. Milan, Moura was handed the No. 7 shirt – the same number he wore while playing for São Paulo. He made his season debut for PSG in their 2–0 Trophée des Champions victory over Coupe de France winners EA Guingamp on 2 August 2014 at the Workers Stadium in Beijing.

He scored his first goal of the 2014–15 Ligue 1 campaign on 16 August, volleying in a Gregory van der Wiel cross as PSG defeated Bastia 2–0. On 5 October, Moura scored the opening goal in a match that finished 1–1 against title rivals Monaco. With his two goals in PSG's 3–0 victory over Bordeaux on 25 October, he equalled his league tally from the previous season.

On 7 August 2015, Moura scored the first goal of the 2015–16 Ligue 1 season in PSG's 1–0 defeat of Lille OSC at the Stade Pierre-Mauroy.

On 15 October 2016, Moura scored PSG's first goal in the 13th minute in a 2–1 away win against AS Nancy in a Ligue 1 match with a curling free-kick from the left which nobody got a touch to; that was his fifth league goal of the 2016–17 Ligue 1 season. For the 2017–18 Ligue 1 season, he appeared only as substitute six times for the club, and left in January 2018.

Tottenham Hotspur
On 31 January 2018, Moura signed a contract with Tottenham Hotspur until 2023 for a transfer fee of around £25 million.  He made his debut for Tottenham in the 2017–18 UEFA Champions League match against Juventus on 13 February 2018, coming on as a late substitute in the match that ended in a 2–2 draw. He made his first start as well as scoring his first goal for the club in the FA Cup tie against Rochdale on 18 February 2018 that also finished 2–2.

In the 2018–19 season, Moura scored his first Premier League goal on 18 August 2018 in Spurs' 3–1 win over Fulham. In the following match on 27 August 2018, he scored a brace against Manchester United as Tottenham won 3–0 in only their third away win at Old Trafford in 27 games. He scored his first Champions League goal for Spurs in the group round match against PSV. In the away match against Barcelona at Camp Nou, Moura scored a late equaliser after Barcelona took an early lead in the game. The game ended 1–1, which sent Tottenham through into the knockout stage together with Barcelona. On 13 April 2019, he scored a hat-trick in the 4–0 win over Huddersfield Town. This was his first hat-trick in Europe and the first ever hat-trick scored at the new Tottenham Hotspur Stadium.

On 8 May 2019, Moura scored a second half hat-trick in Tottenham's 3–2 victory over Ajax at the Johan Cruyff Arena in the second leg of their Champions League semi-finals. Spurs came back from 2–0 down on the night, and 3–0 down on aggregate to win on away goals. His third goal, in the 96th minute, sent his team into a Champions League final for the first time in their history. This performance lead L'Équipe to award him a perfect 10 rating, making him the tenth ever player to be awarded a 10 rating by them.

On 9 August 2019, Moura signed a new contract with Tottenham until 2024. He scored his first goal of the 2019–20 season on 17 August 2019, equalising against Manchester City within nineteen seconds of being introduced as a substitute.

International career

Youth career and early senior career

Moura was a frequent member of Brazil's Under-20 international side. In February 2011, he played for Brazil in the Under-20 South American Championship where he scored a hat-trick in a 6–0 victory over Uruguay in the final. Moura made his senior international debut for Brazil in a friendly match against Scotland on 27 March 2011. On 28 September 2011, Moura scored his first senior international goal for Brazil against Argentina.

2011 Copa América
Moura was named in Mano Menezes' squad for the 2011 Copa América in Argentina. Moura appeared in the group stage matches against Paraguay, Ecuador and Venezuela as a second-half substitute on all occasions. He once again featured as a substitute in Brazil's penalty shoot-out defeat to Paraguay in the quarter-finals which eliminated Brazil from the competition.

2012 Olympics
Moura was selected to compete for the Brazil Olympic football team in the 2012 Summer Olympics in London along with club teammates Casemiro and Bruno Uvini. He appeared in three matches as a substitute, including the Gold medal match with Mexico, and started in the 3–0 group stage victory over New Zealand.

2013 Confederations Cup
Moura was selected by Luiz Felipe Scolari for the 2013 FIFA Confederations Cup on home soil.

Copa América Centenario
In 2016, Moura was named in Dunga's 23-man squad for the Copa América Centenario in the United States.

Style of play
Credited as a quick and mobile winger, who is also powerful, creative, and technically gifted, Moura is also known for his explosive acceleration, agility, jumping, and pace – both on and off the ball –, as well as his movement, and his excellent dribbling skills, in particular his use of trickery and feints, which make him a dangerous offensive threat. A versatile player, he is also capable of playing in several positions, and has also been deployed as a forward, in midfield, as a support striker, or even as an attacking midfielder behind the strikers. However, he has been accused of being inconsistent in the media, in particular in his youth, while his vision and decision–making have also been cited as weaknesses to his game.

Career statistics

Club

International

Scores and results tables list Brazil's goal tally first.

Honours
São Paulo
Copa Sudamericana: 2012

Paris Saint-Germain
Ligue 1: 2012–13, 2013–14, 2014–15, 2015–16
Coupe de France: 2014–15, 2015–16, 2016–17
Coupe de la Ligue: 2013–14, 2014–15, 2015–16, 2016–17
Trophée des Champions: 2013, 2014, 2015, 2016

Tottenham Hotspur
EFL Cup runner-up: 2020–21
UEFA Champions League runner-up: 2018–19

Brazil U20
South American U-20 Championship: 2011

Brazil U23
Summer Olympic silver medal: 2012

Brazil
FIFA Confederations Cup: 2013

Individual
Campeonato Brasileiro Série A Team of the Year: 2012
Bola de Prata: 2012
UNFP Ligue 1 Player of the Month: October 2014
Premier League Player of the Month: August 2018
UEFA Champions League Squad of the Season: 2018–19

References

External links

 Profile at the Tottenham Hotspur F.C. website
 
 
 
 

1992 births
Living people
Footballers from São Paulo
Brazilian footballers
Brazil youth international footballers
Brazil under-20 international footballers
Brazil international footballers
Association football wingers
Clube Atlético Juventus players
São Paulo FC players
Paris Saint-Germain F.C. players
Tottenham Hotspur F.C. players
Campeonato Brasileiro Série A players
Ligue 1 players
Premier League players
Olympic footballers of Brazil
2011 Copa América players
Footballers at the 2012 Summer Olympics
2013 FIFA Confederations Cup players
Copa América Centenario players
Olympic silver medalists for Brazil
Olympic medalists in football
Medalists at the 2012 Summer Olympics
FIFA Confederations Cup-winning players
Brazilian expatriate footballers
Expatriate footballers in France
Expatriate footballers in England
Brazilian expatriate sportspeople in France
Brazilian expatriate sportspeople in England
Brazilian Christians